Campbell Lutyens is an independent private markets advisory firm exclusively focused on primary fundraising, secondary transactions and GP capital advisory services in the private equity, private debt, infrastructure and sustainable investing markets. The firm has offices in London, New York City, Paris, Chicago, Los Angeles, Charlotte, Hong Kong and Singapore and comprises a team of over 200 professionals representing over 40 nationalities.

Campbell Lutyens was founded in 1988 by John Campbell, Richard Lutyens (deceased) and Bill Dacombe. Andrew Sealey has been CEO since 2003.

Business Lines
The firm operates three business lines:

 Fundraising for private equity, private debt, infrastructure and sustainable investing fund managers (as a placement agent). Campbell Lutyens assists private equity firms in raising funds and advises on all stages and aspects of the fundraising process including strategy, documentation and structuring. The firm acts typically for European, US and Asian managers raising funds of between $300 million and $5 billion from institutional investors globally.
 Advisory services for limited partners and general partners with a focus on the secondary market, including the sale and restructuring of portfolios. In addition to advising institutions and asset managers on the secondary sale of portfolios of limited partnership fund interests, the firm advises general partners of private equity, private debt and infrastructure funds on the realization, refocusing or resizing of funds. Typically, advisory transaction mandates range in size from $100 million to $3 billion.
 Advisory services for general partners on investment and strategic growth decisions related to their management companies and general partner financing options, including minority GP equity investments.

See also
 Infrastructure
 Private equity
 Private equity secondary market

References

External links
 Campbell Lutyens (official website)
  Campbell Lutyens profile, British Venture Capital Association directory
 UK Financial Services Authority
 Marathon of Marathons, Athens 2010

Financial services companies established in 1988
Investment banks
Private equity secondary market